The Liga Latinoamérica (LLA) is the top level of professional League of Legends in Latin America. The esports league is run by Riot Games Latin America. Each annual competitive season is divided into opening and closing seasons, which conclude with a playoff tournament between the top four teams.

Plans for the league were first announced in May 2018 by Riot Games, which stated that it would merge Latin America's two regional leagues, the Liga Latinoamérica Norte (LLN, North Latin America League) and Copa Latinoamérica Sur (CLS, South Latin America Cup), into a single competition.

Format 
Each opening and closing season consists of a group stage and a playoff stage. In the group stage, teams compete for points in a triple round robin spread over two phases. The top four teams from the group stage advance to the playoff stage, which uses a "King of the Hill" single elimination bracket. During the 2019 season, there were no phases in the group stage, and six teams participated in a standard single elimination bracket in the playoff stage.

Group stage

Phase 1 
 Eight teams participate
 Double round robin, matches are best-of-one
 Match victories award teams one point
 Top five teams advance to Phase 2

Phase 2 
 Five teams participate
 Single round robin, matches are best-of-one
 Teams retain their points from Phase 1; Phase 2 match victories award teams two points
 Top four teams advance to playoffs

Playoffs 
 "King of the Hill" single elimination bracket
 Matches are best-of-five
 Winner qualifies for the Mid-Season Invitational (opening season) or World Championship (closing season).

Current teams

Past seasons

Notes

References 

League of Legends competitions
Recurring sporting events established in 2018
Sports leagues in Chile
Sports leagues in Mexico